Jens Munk Island, uninhabited coastal island in eastern Greenland in the Sermersooq municipality. It is named after the Dano-Norwegian navigator and explorer Jens Munk. The island is the largest in the Søren Norby Islands archipelago.

Geography
The island is located on the southern side of Pikiulleq Bay and north of the Fridtjof Nansen Peninsula, separated from the mainland by a 45 km long sound named Kagssortoq (Kattertooq), which has a width ranging between 0.7 and 6.5 km. The southern part of the island is covered by an ice cap. 

The island has an area of 470.7  km ² and a shoreline of 185.9 kilometres. Its southernmost point is Cape Lovelorn, projecting from a steep 280 m high headland at the northern limit of Umivik Bay.

See also
List of islands of Greenland

References

Uninhabited islands of Greenland
Sermersooq